The Patternist series (also known as the Patternmaster series or Seed to Harvest) is a group of science fiction novels by Octavia E. Butler that detail a secret history continuing from the Ancient Egyptian period to the far future that involves telepathic mind control and an extraterrestrial plague. A profile of Butler in Black Women in America notes that the themes of the series include "racial and gender-based animosity, the ethical implications of biological engineering, the question of what it means to be human, ethical and unethical uses of power, and how the assumption of power changes people."

Butler's first published novel, 1976's Patternmaster, was the first book in this series to appear. From 1977 until 1984, she published four more Patternist novels: Mind of My Mind (1977), Survivor (1978), Wild Seed (1980) and Clay's Ark (1984). Until Butler began publishing the Xenogenesis trilogy in 1987, all but one of her published books  were Patternist novels (1979's Kindred was the exception).

Butler later expressed a dislike for the novel Survivor, and declined to bring it back into print.

Plot summaries

Wild Seed (1980) 
Chronologically, the series starts with the fourth novel published, Wild Seed. Set in the 17th and 18th centuries, the story involves the relationship between two immortals - Doro, a man born in Africa thousands of years ago, who survives by transferring his consciousness from one body to another (feeding on each new victim's mental energy in the process), and Anyanwu, a shape-shifting healer with perfect control over her body. They struggle to live together over generations as Doro attempts to create a new race through a selective breeding program.

Mind of My Mind (1977)
The series' history continues with Mind of My Mind, in which Doro's breeding program has created a society of networked telepaths that he struggles to control. By the end of the novel Doro's thousands-of-years long breeding program has succeeded, but he is killed in the process, and the first patternmaster takes his place as leader of the patternists, establishing control over the fictional city of Forsyth, California, which is still the seat of their power during the time of Patternmaster

Clay's Ark (1984) 
Clay's Ark, the last book of the series to be published, deals with a colony of people who have been mutated by a disease that astronauts brought back to Earth from outer space. The group struggles to keep itself isolated enough to keep the disease from spreading throughout humanity.

Survivor (1978) 
Survivor, the book in the series that Butler later disowned, depicts the Clay's Ark disease ravaging the Earth, and Doro's telepathic descendants asserting control over what remains of humanity. One group of regular humans decides to escape Earth to a new planet, where they struggle to co-exist with the species that already live there.

Patternmaster (1976)
Patternmaster, the first book to be published but the last in the series' internal chronology, depicts a distant future where the human race has been sharply divided into the dominant Patternists, their enemies the "diseased" and animalistic Clayarks, and the enslaved "mutes", regular humans without any enhanced abilities. The Patternists, bred for intelligence and psychic abilities, are networked telepaths. They are ruled by the most powerful telepath, known as the Patternmaster. Patternmaster tells the coming-of-age story of Teray, a young Patternist who learns he is a son of the Patternmaster. Teray fights for position within Patternist society and eventually for the role of Patternmaster. Patternmaster explores the creation and maintenance of social and genetic hierarchies. For Gregory Jerome Hampton, Patternmaster "presents several questions about how race works in a social structure and how gender works in the function of race."

Compilations
Patternmaster, Clay's Ark, Wild Seed, and Mind of My Mind were published in a single volume titled Seed to Harvest in 2007.

References

Further reading
Bogstad, Janice. “Octavia E. Butler and Power Relations.” Janus 4.4 (197879): 2829.
Buckman, Alyson R. "“‘What Good Is All This To Black People?’: Octavia Butler's Reconstruction of Corporeality."  FEMSPEC 4.2 (2004):  201-218. "Octavia Butler."  For Women in Science Fiction and Fantasy, Vol. 2.  Ed. Robin Reid.  Westport, CT:  Greenwood, 2007. Octavia Butler.  “Kindred.”  In The Facts on File Companion to the American Novel. Edited by Abby H. P. Werlock.  New York: Facts on File, Inc., 2006.
Colema, Letetia F. "Octavia E. Butler's Patternist Series: A Cultural Analysis". Dissertation Abstracts International, Section A: The Humanities and Social Sciences (DAIA): 58.6 (1997 Dec.), pp. 2201. 2004&res_dat=xri:pqdiss&rft_val_fmt=info:ofi/fmt:kev:mtx:dissertation&rft_dat=xri:pqdiss:9737929
Ferreira, Maria Aline. "Symbiotic Bodies and Evolutionary Tropes in the Work of Octavia Butler." Science Fiction Studies 37.3 [112] (2010): 401415.
Gant-Britton, Lisbeth. "Butler, Octavia (1947– )." African American Writers. Ed. Valerie Smith. 2nd ed. Vol. 1. New York: Charles Scribner's Sons, 2001. 95110.
Holden, Rebecca J. "'I Began Writing about Power Because I Had So Little': The Impact of Octavia Butler's Early Work on Feminist Science Fiction as a Whole (and on One Feminist Science Fiction Scholar in Particular)." Strange Matings: Science Fiction, Feminism, African American Voices, and Octavia E. Butler. Ed. Rebecca J. Holden and Nisi Shawl. Seattle, WA: Aqueduct, 2013. 1744. MLA International Bibliography. Web. 1 Feb. 2016.
"Patternmaster." Novels for Students. Ed. Sara Constantakis. Vol. 34. Detroit: Gale, 2010. 258281.
Pfeiffer, John R. "Butler, Octavia Estelle (b. 1947)." Science Fiction Writers: Critical Studies of the Major Authors from the Early Nineteenth Century to the Present Day. Ed. Richard Bleiler. 2nd ed. New York: Charles Scribner's Sons, 1999.
Pfeiffer, John R. "The Patternist Series." Magill's Guide To Science Fiction & Fantasy Literature (1996).
Pfeiffer, John R. "Octavia Butler Writes the Bible." Shaw and Other Matters. Ed. Susan Rusinko. Selinsgrove, Pa.: Susquehanna University Press, 1998. 140154.

Smith, Frances Foster. “Octavia Butler’s Black Female Fiction.” Extrapolation, Vol. 23, No. 1, Spring, 1982, pp. 3749.

Patternist Series
Science fiction novel series
Novels by Octavia Butler